is a railway station in Nakagawa-ku, Nagoya, Aichi Prefecture, Japan. It is located 7.5 rail kilometres from the terminus of the Kansai Line at Nagoya Station.

Lines
Central Japan Railway Company (JR Central)
Kansai Main Line

Layout
Haruta Station has a two elevated opposed side platforms.

Platforms

Adjacent stations

|-
!colspan=5|Central Japan Railway Company (JR Central)

History
Haruta Station was established Haruta Signal Stop on August 1, 1993. It was elevated in status to a full station on March 3, 2001.

Station numbering was introduced to the section of the Kansai Main Line operated JR Central in March 2018; Haruta Station was assigned station number CI02.

References

Railway stations in Japan opened in 2001
Railway stations in Aichi Prefecture